is a Japanese politician of the Liberal Democratic Party, a member of the House of Representatives in the Diet (national legislature). A native of Yamagata Prefecture and graduate of Hitotsubashi University, he worked at the Ministry of Home Affairs. He was elected for the first time in 2000 as a member of the Democratic Party of Japan (DPJ) but lost his seat three years later after defecting from the DPJ to join the second incarnation of the New Conservative Party.
He was re-elected in 2005 as a representative for the LDP.

References

External links
 Official website in Japanese.

1943 births
Living people
People from Yamagata Prefecture
Hitotsubashi University alumni
Members of the House of Representatives (Japan)
Democratic Party of Japan politicians
Liberal Democratic Party (Japan) politicians
21st-century Japanese politicians